John Angus Donald Mills (born 8 May 1938) is a British entrepreneur, economist and businessman. He founded British consumer products company JML (John Mills Limited), and is its chairman and majority shareholder. The company carries out direct-to-consumer marketing through major retail stores groups and its shopping channels.

In May 2020, Mills launched The John Mills Institute for Prosperity, a cross-party research initiative focused on achieving higher rates of economic growth.

Early life
Mills was born in Hampstead Garden Suburb, the son of British Army Colonel Kenneth Mills. Mills' brother is lawyer David Mills, who was married to Dame Tessa Jowell, a former Labour Cabinet minister.

Educated at Glenalmond College in Scotland, Mills then read Philosophy, Politics and Economics at Merton College, Oxford. Searching for extra income as a student, he started selling household cleaning goods door-to-door, and in 1958 hired a plane to fly fellow students to Canada for summer jobs, making a profit by selling off the seats, while also selling household cleaning products door to door.

Career 
After two years of National Service, he joined Unilever's graduate scheme, but quit after six months to start his own business.

Mills founded Fairlane UK Ltd. which initially sold imported products at trade fairs and exhibitions, and latterly manufactured them. As the pound rose during Margaret Thatcher's government, Fairlane UK went out of business in 1984. Charged by Trading Standards for selling brass trinkets as gold-plated jewellery, he pleaded guilty and was fined £750.

In 1986, Mills went on to found John Mills Limited, commonly known as JML, in the basement of his house in Camden, England. JML is a multi-channel retailer that sells consumer products through in-store video, TV shopping channels, and the internet. The company is based in London and Tyne Dock in the North East of England.

JML sells more than 15 million products a year in more than 70 countries and employs about 250 people.

Economics and politics

Labour Party 
Mills is a supporter and major donor to the Labour Party. He served as a councillor for the party in the London Borough of Camden for most of the period between 1971 and 2006. During his tenure on Camden council, he held a number of political appointments, including Deputy Chairman of the London Docklands Corporation, Chair of the Housing Committee at the Association of Metropolitan Authorities and the London Boroughs Association, and Chair of both the Housing and Finance Committees of the London Borough of Camden.

Mills contested Chipping Barnet at both general elections in February and October 1974, but was defeated both times by the Conservative former Chancellor of the Exchequer, Reginald Maudling. He was also a Labour candidate in the 1979 European Parliamentary election.

In 2013, Mills donated £1,650,000 to the Labour Party in JML shares, making him the party's biggest financial donor.

European Union and Brexit 
A life-long Eurosceptic, Mills has been the Secretary of the Labour Euro-Safeguards Campaign since 1975. Mills has served on the board of various Eurosceptic lobby groups. In the lead up to the 2016 referendum on the UK's membership of the European Union, Mills was Chair of The People's Pledge, Co-Chairman of Business for Britain and Chair of Labour for a Referendum. He is the Vice Chair of the Economic Research Council and founder of Labour Future.

During the referendum, he served as the Chair and then Vice Chair of Vote Leave, the official designated campaign group for Britain to exit the European Union. In April 2016, Mills left Vote Leave to run Labour Leave which campaigned among left of centre voters for Brexit.

In July 2018, he resigned from Labour Leave, Labour Future, The Pound Campaign, Business for Brexit, and Labour for Britain, to comply with Ofcom requirements and to avoid any conflict of interest through also running a TV shopping channel.

Economics 
Mills is also an economist and author. He is a noted campaigner for a managed exchange rate policy, which sees sterling at parity with the dollar. He believes that reindustrialisation could increase the UK's economic growth rate by up to 2% per annum.

Mills has published a series of books on economics, exchange rate policy, the Eurozone, and manufacturing, subjects on which he also blogs. His published books include A Critical History of Economics, Managing the World Economy, and Britain’s Achilles Heel. In September 2020, Mills published The Elephant in the Room, a book on why Britain needs to rebalance its economy after 40 years of deindustrialisation.

In 2018, Mills launched the IPPR Economic Prize, which was run by the Institute for Public Policy Research. The prize awarded £100,000 for the best proposal to increase UK economic growth. Mills sat on the judging panel alongside Stephanie Flanders, John Eatwell, and Dame Helena Morrissey DBE.

In May 2020, Mills, in his own capacity, launched the John Mills Institute for Prosperity. The Institute seeks to provide policymakers with fresh ideas for economic growth. It launched with a report into how Britain can recover from the impact of COVID-19 through a manufacturing revival.

In popular culture
Mills was portrayed by Nicholas Day in the 2019 Channel 4 drama, Brexit: The Uncivil War.

Personal life
He was married to barrister Dame Barbara Mills QC, who from 1992 to 1998 was Director of Public Prosecutions, from July 1962, shortly after they both graduated from Oxford, until her death in May 2011. The couple had a son and three daughters. Mills lives in London.

In 1995, he was stabbed and seriously injured in a mugging in North London. The muggers went on to be involved in the murder of Philip Lawrence later in 1995.

In 2018, Mills founded the John Mills Charitable Trust, which supports research causes. He is a supporter of the mental health charity SANE, of whom his partner Marjorie Wallace is Chief Executive.

Mills used to hold a pilot's licence.

Selected publications
Why Trump Won (Labour Future Ltd, November 2016)
Brexit Economics: How to make the UK economy the powerhouse of Europe whatever happens with the Brexit negotiations (Labour Future, April 2017)
Britain's Achilles Heel: Our Uncompetitive Pound (Civitas, May 2017)
Raising Productivity (Labour Future, February 2018) 
Manufacturing a Recovery from Coronavirus (The Institute for Prosperity, May 2020)
The Elephant in the Room (Civitas, September 2020)

See also
 Labour for a Referendum

References

1938 births
Living people
Alumni of Merton College, Oxford
British Eurosceptics
British retail company founders
Councillors in the London Borough of Camden
Labour Party (UK) councillors
Labour Party (UK) donors
People educated at Glenalmond College